King Ai of Zhou personal name  Ji Quji, was the twenty-ninth king of the Chinese Zhou dynasty and the seventeenth of Eastern Zhou. He was the eldest son of King Zhending of Zhou.

He succeeded his father in 441 BC, but was killed by his younger brother, Prince Shuxi, after only three months on the throne.

Ancestry

See also
Family tree of ancient Chinese emperors

Sources 

441 BC deaths
Zhou dynasty kings
5th-century BC Chinese monarchs
Year of birth unknown